The Blonde Geisha (German: Die blonde Geisha) is a 1923 Austrian silent film directed by Ludwig Czerny and starring Ferry Sikla, Mizzi Schütz and Ada Svedin.

The film's sets were designed by the art director Robert Neppach.

Cast
 Ferry Sikla as Tobias Snippendale, Großkaufmann 
 Mizzi Schütz as Virginy, seine Frau 
 Ada Svedin as Mary, deren Tochter 
 Charles Willy Kayser as Percival Geshford, Dirigent Willy Kaiser 
 Friedrich Berger as Thomas Brown - Snippendales 
 Karl Harbacher as Johnny - sein Sohn 
 Pawel Markow as Jamagata - ein japanischer Marquis 
 Friedel de Fries as Osukisan - seine Geisha

References

Bibliography
 Alfred Krautz. International directory of cinematographers, set- and costume designers in film, Volume 4. Saur, 1984.

External links

1923 films
Austrian silent feature films
Austrian drama films
Films directed by Ludwig Czerny
Austrian black-and-white films
1923 drama films
Silent drama films
1920s German-language films